Berglind is a Swedish surname. As of 2013, there are 1,426 people with this surname in Sweden.

Notable people
Notable people who have the surname Berglind include:
 Anders Berglind (born 1958), Swedish sports shooter
 Jeanette Berglind (1816–1903), Swedish sign language teacher
 Mats Berglind (1952–2016), Swedish politician
 Sarah Berglind (born 1996), Swedish ice hockey player
 Victor Berglind (born 1992), Swedish ice hockey player

See also
 Berglind (given name), an Icelandic feminine given name

References